María Carolina Birizamberri Rivero (born 9 July 1995) is a Uruguayan footballer and futsal player who plays as a forward for Argentine club River Plate and the Uruguay women's national team.

Club career
Birizamberri is a three-time Campeonato Uruguayo Femenino top scorer. in 2015, she scored 53 goals in 18 matches for River Plate Montevideo. After that, she joined River Plate from Argentina.

International career
Birizamberri represented Uruguay at the 2012 South American U-17 Women's Championship, 2012 FIFA U-17 Women's World Cup and the 2014 South American U-20 Women's Championship. At senior level, she played three Copa América Femenina editions (2010, 2014 and 2018).

International goals
Scores and results list Uruguay's goal tally first

Honours and achievements

Club
River Plate
Campeonato de Fútbol Femenino: 2016–17

Individual
Campeonato Uruguayo Femenino top scorer: 2011 (for Bella Vista), 2013 (for Nacional), 2015 (for River Plate Montevideo)
Copa Libertadores Femenina top scorer: 2017 (for River Plate)
Premio Charrúa as the 2012 Best Uruguayan Women's Footballer

References

External links

1995 births
Living people
Footballers from Montevideo
Uruguayan women's footballers
Women's association football forwards
Women's association football midfielders
C.A. Cerro players
C.A. Bella Vista players
Club Nacional de Football players
Club Atlético River Plate (Montevideo) players
Club Atlético River Plate (women) players
Uruguay women's international footballers
Uruguayan expatriate women's footballers
Uruguayan expatriate sportspeople in Argentina
Expatriate  footballers in Argentina
Uruguayan expatriate sportspeople in Spain
Expatriate women's footballers in Spain
Uruguayan women's futsal players